Comet in Moominland (Swedish: Kometjakten / Mumintrollet på kometjakt / Kometen kommer) is the second in Finnish author Tove Jansson's series of Moomin books. Published in 1946, it marks the first appearance of several main characters, such as Snufkin and the Snork Maiden.

The English translation, published in 1951, is a translation of the first version of Jansson's book, which she was later to revise. The revised version was published in 1968. It contains a number of minor differences; for instance, the Silk Monkey character is changed to a kitten.

Plot summary
The story begins a few weeks after the events of The Moomins and the Great Flood, as the Moomin family are settling into their new life in Moominvalley. Sniff, who is now living with the Moomins, discovers a mysterious path in a nearby forest. As he and Moomintroll explore it, they meet the mischievous Silk Monkey and arrive at a beach, where Moomintroll goes pearl-fishing. Meanwhile, Sniff and the Silk Monkey find a cave, and the three decide to hide Moomintroll's pearls there.

The next day, as they go back to the cave, they find the pearls arranged in the shape of a star with a tail. Back at Moominhouse, the Muskrat, a philosopher whose home was ruined by Moominpappa's bridge-building and who is now staying with them, explains that the pearls depict a comet. He directs Moomintroll to the Observatory on the Lonely Mountains, where the Professors would be able to tell him whether the comet will hit the Earth.

Moomintroll and Sniff set sail towards the Lonely Mountains, and on the way they meet Snufkin, who joins them. The river takes them into a cave under the mountains where they almost fall into a hole, but at the last moment a Hemulen inadvertently rescues them when he mistakes Snufkin's harmonica-playing for a rare caterpillar and reaches his butterfly net into the cave to catch it. They find themselves in the Lonely Mountains and set off towards the Observatory. On the way they are attacked by an eagle and Moomintroll finds a gold ring, which Snufkin tells him belongs to the Snork Maiden he had met a few months earlier.

At the Observatory, one of the professors tells them that the comet is going to hit the Earth, and gives them the exact date and time that it's going to happen. Realising they only have a few days left, they hurry back towards Moominvalley, noticing that the heat from the comet's approach is starting to dry up smaller streams. In a forest they come across the Snork Maiden being attacked by a poisonous bush. Moomintroll saves her, and she and her brother join them. Further on, they arrive at the sea to find it all dried up. They use stilts to cross it, and the Snork Maiden saves Moomintroll from a giant octopus.

On the other side of the sea they meet another Hemulen, and manage to survive a tornado by using his dress as a glider. Finally they arrive in Moominvalley and the whole family, together with the Hemulen, the Muskrat and the Snorks, go to the cave, making it there just in time to seek shelter from the comet. Believing the impact to have destroyed everything, they fall asleep, only to discover the next morning, to their great delight, that the comet had missed the Earth altogether and everything is back the way it used to be.

Revised versions
Jansson's first version of the novel was published in Swedish in 1946, and was the basis for some translations, including the English translation. Jansson later revised the book, and made numerous changes in her final version, published in 1968. The updated 1968 version, which became the basis for many subsequent translations, contains numerous minor and several major edits and revisions, which include:

 Several scenes have been removed, notably passages thought to have been too frightful to younger readers, such as the crocodiles' attack (and its illustration), as well as the parts which painted Snufkin as a thief; the updated Snufkin is purely a care-free wanderer,
 The Kitten replaces the Monkey of the original version; he has a very different personality, and has fewer, different interactions with Moomintroll and with Sniff (who desperately wants to befriend him in the updated novel),
 Several illustrations are drawn anew in the updated edition, to improve their appearance and match Jansson's evolved style; others, such as the Kitten, are added,
 References to the flood from Jansson's first novel about the Moomins have been removed,
 References to actual places (e.g. Mexico) and religious figures (e.g. Moses) have been removed,
 The descriptions of environment and nature have been updated in several passages to resemble Finland,
 Some of the characters' personalities have been updated, keeping them overall gentler to one another,
 Sniff's personality is slightly toned down in the updated edition, making him a little less obnoxious and greedy; however, his secret jealousy of Moomintroll is slightly emphasized,
 Moomintroll's and Sniff's friendship is built up; in the end, it is Sniff who attempts to find the Kitten, while Moomintroll runs out to rescue him,
 The comet actually endangers Moominvalley and leaves visible damage to the rocks and the ground, as well as scattered meteorites, which the Moomins collect as they observe the return of the sea.

Other versions
Jansson wrote and illustrated a black-and-white comic strip version for newspapers. The 86-day story does not follow the book's plot; for example, the Moomins get their news from a radio, not a trip to the observatory, and Little My appears throughout the story, albeit often observing. In this version the comet hits Moominvalley dead on, laying the landscape bare. Right away, however, flowers bloom, and life begins again.

The novel has been adapted into animation several times, including the 1978 series Mumi-troll, the 1992 feature Tanoshii Mūmin Ikka: Mūmindani no Suisei, and 12 episodes of the stop-motion animated 1977–1982 Polish TV series, The Moomins (the storyline of which was based on Jansson's preferred 1968 revision of the novel, which had also been the basis of its Polish translation). The episodes of the stop-motion series were remastered, re-recorded with a full voice cast, and edited into the 2010 compilation movie Moomins and the Comet Chase.

References

External links
 The Moomin Trove
 Description of the novel and its revisions on the official Moomin website

1946 children's books
1946 fantasy novels
1946 science fiction novels
Fiction about comets
20th-century Finnish novels
Novels about impact events
Moomin books
Swedish-language novels
1946 Finnish novels